is a former Japanese football player.

Playing career
Wakamatsu was born in Aichi Prefecture on August 2, 1976. After graduating from high school, he joined Japan Football League (JFL) club Cosmo Oil (later Cosmo Oil Yokkaichi) in 1995. He played many matches as right side back from first season. However the club was disbanded end of 1996 season. In 1997, he moved to JFL club Montedio Yamagata. He played as regular player in 2 seasons. In 1998, he moved to J1 League club Shimizu S-Pulse on loan. However he could not play at all in the match. In 1999, he moved to newly was promoted to J2 League club, Oita Trinita. He played as regular player and the club won the champions in 2002 and was promoted to J1 from 2003. However his opportunity to play decreased in 2003. In 2004, he moved to J2 club Omiya Ardija. He played many matches and retired end of 2004 season.

Club statistics

References

External links

1976 births
Living people
Association football people from Aichi Prefecture
Japanese footballers
J1 League players
J2 League players
Japan Football League (1992–1998) players
Cosmo Oil Yokkaichi FC players
Montedio Yamagata players
Shimizu S-Pulse players
Oita Trinita players
Omiya Ardija players
Association football defenders